The Mid-American Conference Men's Soccer Awards are the annual awards given to the top coach, the best player, and the best freshman in the Mid-American Conference (MAC) during the NCAA Division I men's soccer season as voted on by the conference's head coaches.

Player of the Year

1993 Paul Wilkinson, Akron
1994 Dan Creech, Miami †
1995 Dustin Swinehart, Miami †
1996 Steve Klein, Bowling Green
1997 Eirik Frederiksen, Northern Illinois
1998 Michael Apple, Akron
1999 Steve Butcher, Buffalo †
2000 Byron Carmichael, Marshall #
2001 Illka Jantti, Kentucky #
2002 Byron Carmichael, Marshall #
2003 Jamal Shteiwi, Kentucky #
2004 Jamal Shteiwi, Kentucky #
2005 Ross McKenzie, Akron
2006 Siniša Ubiparipović, Akron
2007 Cory Sipos, Akron
2008 Steve Zakuani, Akron
2009 Teal Bunbury Akron
2010 Darlington Nagbe, Akron
2011 Darren Mattocks, Akron
2012 Scott Caldwell, Akron
2013 Aodhan Quinn, Akron
2014 Andy Bevin, West Virginia
2015 Russell Cicerone, Buffalo †
2016 Adam Najem, Akron 
2017 Brandon Bye, Western Michigan

Freshman of the Year
(Was Newcomer of the Year 1993–2013)

1993 Christin Handsor, Akron
1994 Jason Began, Bowling Green
1995 Justin Millard, Akron
1996 George Tomasso, Eastern Michigan † 
1997 Norman Dutch, Marshall #
1998 Illka Jantti, Kentucky #
1999 Torbjorn Birkeland, Akron & Byron Carmichael, Marshall #
2000 Reece Richardson, Western Michigan
2001 John Monebrake, Kentucky #
2002 Kirk Harwat, Akron
2003 Riley O'Neill, Kentucky #
2004 Curt Zastrow, Northern Illinois
2005 Evan Bush, Akron
2006 Marcus McCarty, Northern Illinois
2007 Steve Zakuani, Akron
2008 Darlington Nagbe, Akron
2009 Zarek Valentin, Akron
2010 Darren Mattocks, Akron
2011 Wil Trapp, Akron
2012 Dillon Serna, Akron & Anthony Grant, Bowling Green
2013 Russell Cicerone, Buffalo †
2014 Joey Piatczyc, West Virginia
2015 Kevin Rodriguez, Northern Illinois
2016 Jonathan Lewis, Akron 
2017 João Moutinho, Akron

Gary V. Palmisano Coach of the Year
(Named for the Bowling Green goalkeeper, assistant coach, and head coach from 1978–92 and 1994 until his untimely death that year.)

1993 Ken Lolla, Akron & Bobby Kramig, Miami †
1994 Bobby Kramig, Miami †
1995 Ken Lolla, Akron
1996 Mel Mahler, Bowling Green
1997 Ian Collins, Kentucky #
1998 Ken Lolla, Akron
1999 Ian Collins, Kentucky #
2000 Bob Gray, Marshall #
2001 Ian Collins, Kentucky #
2002 Mel Mahler, Bowling Green
2003 Chris Karwoski, Western Michigan
2004 Steve Simmons, Northern Illinois
2005 Ken Lolla, Akron
2006 Steve Simmons, Northern Illinois
2007 Caleb Porter, Akron
2008 Caleb Porter, Akron
2009 Caleb Porter, Akron
2010 Caleb Porter, Akron
2011 Caleb Porter, Akron
2012 Caleb Porter, Akron
2013 John Scott, Hartwick #
2014 Marlon LeBlanc, West Virginia
2015 Chad Wiseman, Western Michigan
2016 Eric Nichols, Bowling Green  
2017 Chad Wiseman, Western Michigan 

NOTES:
 # = Team no longer competes in the MAC.
 † = MAC school no longer fields a men's soccer team.

References

College soccer trophies and awards in the United States
MAC
Player of the Year
Awards established in 1993
Freshman of the Year
Coach of the Year